The Claggett Shale is a geological formation in Montana whose strata date back to the Late Cretaceous. Dinosaur remains are among the fossils that have been recovered from the formation.

Vertebrate paleofauna
 Hesperornis altus? - "Tibiotarsus and vertebra." (possibly from the Judith River Formation)
 Hesperornis montana
 cf. Maiasaura
 Tyrannosauridae indet.

See also

 List of dinosaur-bearing rock formations

References

Geologic formations of Montana
Shale formations of the United States
Cretaceous Montana
Campanian Stage